Invisible Storm is an album by Finnish avant-garde jazz composer, bandleader and drummer Edward Vesala recorded in 1991 and released on the ECM label in 1992.

Reception
The Allmusic review awarded the album 2 stars.

Track listing
All compositions by Edward Vesala
 "Sheets And Shrouds" - 0:35   
 "Murmuring Morning" - 1:21   
 "Gordion's Flashes" - 6:26   
 "Shadows on the Frontier" - 7:56   
 "In the Gate of Another Gate" - 1:35   
 "Somnamblues" - 8:39   
 "Sarastus" - 5:36   
 "The Wedding of All Essential Parts" - 11:09   
 "The Invisible Storm" - 7:25   
 "The Haze of the Frost" - 3:25   
 "Caccaroo Boohoo" - 6:26  
Recorded at Sound and Fury Studio in Helsinki, Finland in May and June 1991

Personnel
Edward Vesala - drums, percussion
Matti Riikonen - trumpet
Jorma Tapio - alto saxophone, bass clarinet, flute, percussion, bass flute
Jouni Kannisto - tenor saxophone, flute
Pepa Päivinen - soprano saxophone, tenor saxophone, baritone saxophone, flute, alto flute
Iro Haarla - piano, harp, keyboards
Jimi Sumen - guitar
Marko Ylönen - cello
Pekka Sarmanto - bass
Mark Nauseef - bongos

References

ECM Records albums
Edward Vesala albums
1992 albums
Albums produced by Manfred Eicher